Pakistan International School are schools based outside Pakistan which promote the national curriculum. These schools fall under the jurisdiction of the Federal Board of Intermediate and Secondary Education and cater mainly to students who are not nationals of the host country such as the children of the staff of international businesses, international organizations, embassies, missions, or missionary programs. For overseas Pakistani families, these schools allow continuity in education from Pakistan as most prefer to stay in the same curriculum, especially for older children. Pakistan international schools typically use curricula based on the Federal Board of Intermediate and Secondary Education and offer both Urdu language and English language classes. Some schools also offer International General Certificate of Secondary Education. The first Pakistan international school was opened in Isa Town, Bahrain in 1956 as the Pakistan Urdu School.

List of schools

Africa

Egypt
Pakistan International School (Cairo)

Libya
Pakistan Embassy School (Tripoli)

Asia

Bahrain
Pakistan Urdu School (Isa Town)

China
Pakistan Embassy College (Beijing)

Iran
Pakistan International School (Tehran)

Kuwait
International School of Pakistan (Al Farwaniyah)
New Pakistan International School (Hawally)
Pakistan School & College (Salmiya)

Oman
Pakistan School Buraimi
Pakistan School (Muscat)
Pakistan School Mussanah
Pakistan School Nizwa
Pakistan School Seeb
Pakistan School Sohar

Qatar
Pak Shama School (Doha)

Saudi Arabia
Pakistan International School (Riyadh)
Pakistan International School (Jeddah)
Pakistan International School (Al-Khobar)
Pakistan International School (Taif)
Pakistan International School (Buraydah)
Pakistan International School (Al-Jubail)

Syria
Pakistan International School (Damascus)

United Arab Emirates
Pakistan Education Academy (Dubai)
Pakistan Islamia Higher Secondary School (Sharjah)

Yemen
Pakistan School (Sana'a)

See also
 Overseas Pakistanis
 Education in Pakistan

References